The Instituto Nacional de Matemática Pura e Aplicada (IMPA) is widely considered to be the foremost research and educational institution of Brazil in the area of mathematics. It is located in the city of Rio de Janeiro, and was formerly known simply as Instituto de Matemática Pura e Aplicada, hence its official abbreviation.

It is a research and education institution qualified as a Social Organization (SO) under the auspices of the Ministry of Science, Technology, Innovations and Communications (MCTIC) and the Ministry of Education (MEC) of Brazil. Currently located in the Jardim Botânico neighborhood (South Zone) of Rio de Janeiro, Brazil, IMPA was founded on October 15, 1952. It was the first research unit of the National Research Council (CNPq), a federal funding agency created a year earlier. Its logo is a stylized Möbius strip, reproducing a large sculpture of a Möbius strip on display within the IMPA headquarters.

Founded by Lélio Gama, Leopoldo Nachbin and Maurício Peixoto, IMPA's primary mission is to stimulate scientific research, the training of new researchers and the dissemination and improvement of mathematical culture in Brazil. Mathematical knowledge is fundamental for scientific and technological development, which are indispensable components for economic, social and human progress. Since 2015, IMPA is directed by Marcelo Viana.

History
At the time of creation, IMPA did not have its own headquarters: it was temporarily housed in a room in the headquarters of the Brazilian Center for Research in Physics (created in 1949), in Praia Vermelha, south zone of Rio de Janeiro. The scientific body was also diminutive, though illustrious: in addition to the director, astronomer Lélio Gama, who also headed the National Observatory, the institute counted only the young mathematicians Leopoldo Nachbin and Maurício Peixoto.

Gama's performance at the helm of IMPA, with his experience and wisdom, played a crucial role in the creation and consolidation of the young institute. And Nachbin and Peixoto would later be the first Brazilians invited to lecture at the International Congress of Mathematicians, one of the greatest distinctions in a mathematician's career. The academic prestige of IMPA grew from 1957, with the organization of the first Brazilian Colloquium of Mathematics, with about 50 participants. The Colloquium has been taking place every two years since then, in an uninterrupted fashion. Much of Brazilian mathematics was built around it. Also in 1957, IMPA moved to Rua São Clemente, in Botafogo, also in the South Zone of Rio.
In 1962, the master's and doctoral programs began in Mathematics, through an agreement signed with the Federal University of Rio de Janeiro (UFRJ), which officially awarded the titles of master and doctor. In 1967, IMPA moved again to a historic building on Rua Luiz de Camões, in the center of Rio de Janeiro, which currently houses the Hélio Oiticica Cultural Center. The following year, with support from the National Bank for Economic Development (future BNDES) and later from the Financier of Studies and Projects (FINEP), in addition to CNPq itself, IMPA expanded its work with Brazilian mathematicians in foreign or in phase PhD in the best foreign institutions. Also in 1968, he assumed the Lindolpho de Carvalho Dias direction, which was to lead the consolidation and growth of the institute over 22 years, with special emphasis on the construction of its own headquarters in the neighborhood of Jardim Botânico (south zone), inaugurated in 1981.

Development 
In the 1970s, institutional changes in CNPq allowed for a qualitative leap and the expansion of IMPA's activities. A permanent body of researchers was formally created. Until then, researchers were either kept through scholarships or had occupations in other institutions.

New research areas were established: algebraic geometry, differential geometry, probability, statistics, operational research, optimization and mathematical economics. Previously, activities were focused on dynamic systems, analysis and differential topology. Later, the fields of partial differential equations, fluid dynamics, and computer graphics would be consolidated. Recently, symplectic geometry and discrete mathematics have been added.

In 1971, IMPA became the first mathematical institution in Brazil with a mandate from the Federal Council of Education to award master's and doctoral degrees. The novelty allowed the Master's and PhD program to become a permanent activity. Since then, IMPA's academic postgraduate program has always been awarded the highest grades by the Coordination for Improvement of Higher Level Staff (Capes).

IMPA's own headquarters in the Jardim Botânico neighborhood of Rio de Janeiro opened in July 1981, with the International Symposium on Dynamic Systems.

On two occasions, Lindolpho de Carvalho Dias was temporarily replaced as the director by mathematician Elon Lages Lima, also elected director for the term 1989 – 1993. Lima put his vast academic reputation at the service of the cause of education. The High School Mathematics Teacher Improvement Program (PAPMEM), created in 1990, opened a new and important front for the institute.

Mathematician Jacob Palis was elected director in 1993. He would hold the position for ten years, a period of remarkable growth in IMPA's international prestige.

IMPA's internationalization tendency was accentuated iduring the administration of mathematician César Camacho from 2004 to 2015, a period characterized by the renewal of IMPA's faculty membership, with the hiring of young researchers.

In 2005, the Brazilian Maths Olympiad for Public Schools (OBMEP) was created, an initiative of enormous social impact that strongly reaffirms IMPA's commitment to the dissemination of mathematical knowledge. Held annually by IMPA with funds from the Ministry of Education (MEC) and the Ministry of Science, Technology, Innovations and Communications (MCTIC) and support from the Brazilian Mathematical Society (SBM), OBMEP counts on the participation of over 18 million students in practically all of Brazil's municipalities, almost the entire student population from the 6th grade to the end of high school. Since 2017, it is open to all Brazilian public and private schools.

In 2011, IMPA became a founding member of the network of higher education institutions that perform the Professional Master's in Mathematics (PROFMAT). This is a semi-presential postgraduate program aimed at training the basic education math teacher, coordinated by SBM with the support of IMPA.

International prominence and Social Organization, a new form of management 
During Jacob Palis' tenure, international prestige could be gauged by the fact that from 1991 to 1998 IMPA hosted the International Mathematical Union (IMU). Palis held the position of secretary general during that period.

Another groundbreaking fact of its mandate was IMPA's qualification as a Social Organization (SO) in 2000. Six years earlier, a high level evaluation commission set by the Ministry of Science and Technology concluded that “IMPA excellence makes it a model of what a national institute of basic research should be and the conditions to enable it to preserve this excellence must be provided ”.

Also during this period, IMPA was formally transferred from CNPq to the Ministry of Science and Technology. That accelerated the studies, started a year and a half earlier, to transform the institute into a Social Organization, which came to fruition a year later.

The new model kept the institute in the public sphere, but gave it greater administrative flexibility, as well as more visibility and transparency in its activities.

In 2004, IMPA signed a contract with the Centre National de la Recherche Scientifique (CNRS), France's leading scientific funding agency. The agreement qualified IMPA as a Unité Mixte Internationale  (UMI, International Joint Unit). This opened the possibility for the best French mathematicians to spend long-term periods at IMPA, at no cost to the institute. The contract has been renewed every four years.

From 2016, UMI was renamed after Jean-Christophe Yoccoz, the 1994 Fields Medalist, honorary researcher and long time collaborator and friend of IMPA.

In 1995, IMPA hosted the international meeting that created the Mathematical Union for Latin America and the Caribbean. In 2011, it once again hosted the creation of an international mathematical organization: the Mathematical Council of the Americas.

In 2014, Brazilian mathematician Artur Avila, a researcher and former doctoral student at IMPA, won the Fields Medal, the most prestigious distinction in world mathematics. In the same year, IMPA was honored with the right to organize two major events in the world mathematical calendar: the 2017 International Mathematical Olympiad (IMO) and the 2018 International Congress of Mathematicians (ICM), both in Rio de Janeiro.

In 2016, following an initiative originated from IMPA, the Brazilian Parliament formally proclaimed the Mathematical Biennium (Law 13.358), which dedicated the years 2017 and 2018 to the cause of mathematics, marking the realization in the country of the IMO 2017 and the ICM 2018. The Mathematical Biennium period represented an enormous effort by IMPA to bring mathematics closer to the Brazilian society through initiatives such as the National Mathematics Festival , held in 2017.

In 2018, IMPA and SBM led Brazil's successful bid to join Group 5, the elite group of the International Mathematical Union, along with the other ten most advanced nations in the area. In that year, the cornerstone of IMPA's new campus was laid on land adjacent to the one the institute occupies in Jardim Botânico, donated four years earlier by private sponsors. The new campus will allow for the expansion of IMPA's activities and of its contribution to science and education in Brazil.

Research areas
As of 2015, IMPA does research in algebra, analysis, differential geometry, partial differential equations, computer graphics, fluid dynamics, holomorphic dynamics, mathematical economics, symplectic geometry, algebraic geometry, optimization, probability theory, dynamical systems, and ergodic theory. It is aiming to expand its lines of research to include topology, number theory, combinatorics, and discrete mathematics in general and its applications.

People associated with IMPA
Artur Avila, a 2014 Fields Medalist, is a researcher at IMPA and received his Ph.D there. Among its researchers also are/were Jacob Palis, Elon Lages Lima, Maurício Peixoto, Manfredo do Carmo, Marcelo Viana, Welington de Melo, Enrique Pujals, Harold Rosenberg, Marcos Dajczer, Carlos Gustavo Moreira, Fernando Codá Marques, César Camacho, Arnaldo Garcia, Alfredo Noel Iusem, Karl-Otto Stöhr, Robert Morris, and Carolina Araujo.

Research areas 
 Algebra
 Analysis and partial differential equations
 Computer graphics
 Fluid dynamics
 Mathematical economics
 Complex geometry and holomorphic foliations
 Differential geometry
 Symplectic geometry
 Optimization
 Probability
 Dynamical systems and ergodic theory

See also
People associated with IMPA
Sociedade Brasileira de Matemática
Pure Mathematics
Maria Laura Moura Mouzinho Leite Lopes

References

External links
 IMPA - Instituto Nacional de Matemática Pura e Aplicada (official website)

Education in Rio de Janeiro (city)
Schools of mathematics
Mathematics departments in Brazil
Research institutes in Brazil
Mathematical institutes
Educational institutions established in 1952
1952 establishments in Brazil
Postgraduate schools in Brazil